K. Natraj is an Indian  actor and director who primarily worked in  Tamil-language films and serials.

Personal life

In film industry circle, he is popular as a close friend of actor Rajinikanth. His daughter, Rajini, was married actor Vishnu Vishal from 2011 to 2018.

Career
Producer Azhagan Thamizhmani and writer Thooyavan saw a film called Touch of Love which had Elvis Presley in a guest appearance at a film festival, both got emotional while watching the film which prompted them to attempt a similar story in Tamil. Thooyavan finished screenplay within a month. He wanted to cast the late MGR as the hero but couldn't do so. Thooyavan narrated the story to  K. Natraj who was working as one of the assistant directors in Devar films. K. Natraj agreed to work on the film and Rajini accepted to act in this film. Rajini initially agreed to give callsheet of 6 days then extended for 10 days since he wanted the film to come out well. The film was entirely shot in a school with 300 students. Rajkumar Sethupathi, brother of actress Latha and husband of actress Sripriya did a small role as Ambika's husband. Meena appeared as one of the main characters. On 3 August 1984 The Hindu said, "For one making his debut as director Natraj deserves accolades for the near-to-the-heart treatment of the situations in which the performance of a six-member-group of orphans will make even elder artistes sit up" and concluded, "Babu's camera embellishes the frames".

K. Natraj, Rajinikanth's friend from the film institute who earlier directed Anbulla Rajinikanth was approached by Rajini to take part as an assistant director in Annamalai to which Natraj gladly accepted. Then Rajini approached his friends and announced that he would like to make a film for them. The script of "Valli" was written by Rajini himself. Priyaraman made her debut as heroine while Hariraj and Sanjay were introduced in this film. Rajini was not interested to appear in cameo appearance but with insistence of his friends he accepted to do small role and finished his portions within five days.

Shooting was started in April 1993. This was also debut film of magician Alex as actor. The filming was held at Chalakudi, Pollachi and Red Hills. Hari, director of Saamy and Singam was one of the assistants in this film.

Filmography

As director

As actor

Television

References

External links

Living people
Film directors from Kerala
Tamil film directors
M.G.R. Government Film and Television Training Institute alumni
Male actors in Tamil cinema
Male actors from Kerala
Indian male television actors
Indian male film actors
20th-century Indian male actors
21st-century Indian male actors
20th-century Indian film directors
1949 births